Victoria Mary Florence Cleland (born 26 February 1970) was the Director for Banknotes and Chief Cashier of the Bank of England, a position she held from March 2014 until 1 June 2018 when was replaced by Sarah John (the third woman to be named as Chief Cashier). She is the second woman to hold the post of Chief Cashier. She replaced Chris Salmon when he was appointed as Executive Director for Markets at the Bank of England.

Education
Cleland studied philosophy, politics and economics at the University of Oxford and was sponsored by the bank for an MBA at Imperial College, London.

Career
Cleland has worked for the bank for about 20 years having first tried accountancy as a career. Her first role at the bank was in a department dealing with the financing of small businesses, followed by work in the wholesale market supervision division after which she moved to deal with graduate recruitment.

Cleland worked for three years on financial stability after which she set up the "special resolutions" section which dealt with banks at risk of failure following the recent financial crisis. She was closely involved with the Northern Rock nationalisation.

Cleland was Head of Notes from March 2010 and has been Director for Banknotes and Chief Cashier from March 2014. In that role, Cleland was primarily responsible for ensuring that banks had the right amount and type of notes available at all times. She was also responsible for measures to prevent forgery and the controversial matter of the design of new notes. In 2013, Cleland received, on behalf of the Bank of England, a petition organised by Caroline Criado Perez to keep a woman on the reverse of Bank of England banknotes. To date, other than the portrait of H.M. The Queen on the obverse of all Bank of England notes, Jane Austen on the reverse of the current polymer £10 note is the third historical woman depicted on a Bank of England note. The previous two historical women were Elizabeth Fry on the last paper £5 note from 2002 until May 2017 and Florence Nightingale on the £10 from 1975 until 1994.

As Chief Cashier, Cleland's signature appeared on all Bank of England banknotes.

Victoria Cleland was present at Spink London on 3 October 2016 for the charity auction of Bank of England banknotes, all bearing her signature as Chief Cashier. The auction consisted of first-run prefixes and low serial numbered banknotes of all denominations but was primarily timed to coincide with the recent launch and high demand amongst collectors for the new polymer £5 banknote. The lowest numbered polymer £5 banknote available to the general public was AA01 000017. This was sold for £4,150 with Cleland opening the charity auction and acting as auctioneer for this first lot. This was the fourth charity auction instigated by the Bank of England and the first for banknotes issued under Cleland as Chief Cashier.

Outside banking
Cleland has been a trustee of the Royal London Society for Blind People since 2012.

In February 2018, during an interview with The Guardian, Cleland revealed that she does not use contactless payment cards, in part because she was yet to fully trust the technology. Cleland pointed out that this was a personal opinion and not the official view of the Bank of England.

References

External links
Victoria Cleland talking about how a new Bank of England banknote is produced
Victoria Cleland talking about the security features of plastic banknotes

1970 births
Living people
Alumni of St Hilda's College, Oxford
Alumni of Imperial College London
Chief Cashiers of the Bank of England